Eli David Marienthal (born March 6, 1986) is an American actor. He won the Annie Award for Outstanding Achievement for Voice Acting in a Feature Production for his vocal performance in the animated film The Iron Giant (1999).

Family and personal life
Marienthal was born in Santa Monica, California in 1986, the son of Penny Marienthal and Joseph Cross.  He has two siblings, actors Harley Cross and Flora Cross. Marienthal is Jewish. In addition to acting, Marienthal has written and performed his own work as a poet, dancer, and playwright.

Marienthal graduated from the private East Bay French-American School in Berkeley, where all students learn to speak French and attend classes in two languages, and from Berkeley High School in 2004. He graduated magna cum laude from Brown University in 2008 with a double major in comparative literature and international development studies. He also holds a master's degree in development studies from Brown. As of February 2019, Marienthal is a doctoral candidate in geography at the University of California, Berkeley.

Career

Marienthal's career started in Bay Area stage theater work, performing in Missing Persons, The Cryptogram, Hecuba, A Midsummer Night's Dream, Every 17 Minutes the Crowd Goes Crazy, and The Life of Galileo.

Marienthal is known for the role of Robin (Tim Drake) in Batman: Mystery of the Batwoman and the Static Shock episode "The Big Leagues". He replaced the previous voice actor, Mathew Valencia, because in these appearances, Robin appeared and was supposed to sound older than he had on the animated series. He played the title role of "Tucker Pierce" in the Tucker television series. He is also the voice of Hogarth Hughes in the 1999 film The Iron Giant (his most famous voice acting role) and plays Steve Stifler's younger brother in the 1999 film American Pie and its 2001 sequel, American Pie 2 before his last film role to date was in the teenage-oriented comedy, Confessions of a Teenage Drama Queen (2004), opposite Lindsay Lohan, as Sam.

Filmography

Film

Television

References

External links
 

1986 births
American male child actors
American male film actors
American male stage actors
American male television actors
American male voice actors
Annie Award winners
Berkeley High School (Berkeley, California) alumni
Brown University alumni
Jewish American male actors
Living people
Male actors from Santa Monica, California
20th-century American male actors
21st-century American male actors
21st-century American Jews